Rhonda Volmer is a fictional character in the HBO series Big Love, and is portrayed by Daveigh Chase. She is introduced in the series as the 15-year-old bride-to-be of Juniper Creek cult leader Roman Grant.

Rhonda has a complicated personality. Although extremely intelligent, she is a pathological liar, known to lie in response to even the simplest questions. She lived a very sheltered life. She frequently makes baseless accusations, especially if she believes it will garner the sympathies of those around her. She has a humble, trustworthy demeanor, but she is actually very calculating and manipulative. Rhonda has dreams of moving to New York City and becoming a celebrity. She is selfish and demanding. She desperately wants people to like her but is unable to interact in a way that would actually encourage affection or friendship from anyone.

When Bill Henrickson and Nicolette Grant fled the Juniper Creek Compound, she stowed away in their truck. She has since stayed with the Henricksons, at a shelter, and with another family. At the beginning of season 3, Rhonda is living with a group of teenagers from the compound, including Bill's half-brother Frankie, but is later bribed by Adeleen to leave before she testifies.

She is partly responsible for the outing of Bill's family as polygamists at the end of season one. Rhonda is seen manipulating the family with lies, and learning about the situation with Barb entering the competition for Mother of the Year. Prior to the outing during the Mother of the Year event, Rhonda is seen giving Roman Grant a paper with a number, which he uses to call and inform an unknown person that the Henricksons are polygamists. After Roman makes his call, Rhonda smiles in satisfaction.

In season three, Rhonda appears as a witness for the prosecution in the criminal trial for selling underage brides against Roman Grant. Using her usual troubled but manipulative methods, she thinks she can lie on the stand to get the criminal conviction, then use that to secure a large civil verdict. Bill tries to convince her she won't succeed.  Adaleen finds her and offers her thirty thousand dollars not to testify. She takes the money and hitchhikes to Los Angeles.

Episode four of season five introduces Rhonda as the wife of Cara Lyn's cousin, Verlan, and as mother to Verlan's child Jessica. In the sixth episode of season five, "D.I.V.O.R.C.E", Ben goes to the bar in which Rhonda has been hired as an exotic dancer/singer, and the two end up sleeping together. Ben later tells Rhonda that they cannot do what they did again. Rhonda's relationship with Heather is then slightly less antagonistic than it has been in seasons past until Ben chooses Heather over Rhonda, which leads Rhonda to tell Heather, "He's all yours, lesbo."

Volmer